Seleznyov, often spelled as Seleznev, Selezniev (rarely Селезнев), or Seleznyova, Selezneva (feminine; Селезнёва), is a Russian surname, derived from the word "селезень" (drake, duck). Notable people with the surname include:

Aleksandr Seleznyov (b. 1964), a retired Russian hammer thrower
Alexander Seleznyov (1974–1999), a Russian MVD officer and Hero of Russia
Alexey Selezniev
Anna Selezneva
Gennadiy Seleznyov (1947–2015), a Russian politician
Georgy Seleznyov (1938–2007), a Soviet/Russian bass singer and pedagogue
Kirill Seleznyov (disambiguation), several people
Larisa Selezneva (b. 1963), a former Soviet pairs figure skater
Natalya Seleznyova (b. 1945), a Soviet/Russian actress
Oleg Seleznyov (1959–2021), Russian politician
Olga Seleznyova
Pyotr Seleznyov (1920–1985), a Soviet aircraft pilot and Hero of the Soviet Union
Roman Seleznev (b. 1984), a Russian hacker, son of Valery Seleznev
Serhiy Seleznyov (b. 1975), a Ukrainian footballer
Svetlana Selezneva
Vladimir Seleznyov (1928–1991), a Soviet army officer and a full cavalier of the Order of Glory
Valery Seleznev (1964), a Russian politician
Yevhen Seleznyov (b. 1985), a Ukrainian footballer
Yuriy Seleznyov (b. 1975), a Ukrainian footballer
Ekaterina Selezneva (b. 1995), a Russian rhythmic gymnast

Fictional characters 
Alisa Seleznyova, a character from the series of children's science fiction books by Russian writer Kir Bulychov 

Russian-language surnames